María Paula Romo (born 4 June 1979) is an Ecuadorian politician that served as Minister of Government under President Lenin Moreno.

She was a member of the Constituent Assembly that crafted Ecuador's current Constitution between 2007 and 2008. She later won a seat at the National Assembly of Ecuador for the period 2009–2013.

Life 
She entered politics in 2004 as one of the founders of "Ruptura de los 25", a political leftist movement that participated in the protests that toppled then-president Lucio Gutiérrez. Two years later, Ruptura de los 25 supported Rafael Correa in his successful bid to become Ecuador's President in the Ecuadorian 2006 general election.

The group broke their alliance with Correa in 2010 after he took actions they perceived as authoritarian. Romo participated along Ruptura de los 25 in the 2013 general election in opposition to Correa, but she did not keep her seat.

President Moreno chose Romo as Ecuador's Interior Minister on 31 August 2018.

National Assembly members Lourdes Cuesta, Amapola Naranjo and Roberto Gómez, challenged Romo saying that she had failed to fulfil her ministerial duties during the national strike in October 2019. On November 24, the National Assembly, with 104 positive votes, approved the motion to censure and dismiss her for allowing harsh police intervention against protesters during that strike. She was also accused of allowing police to use expired tear gas canisters that endangered people's lives during the 11 days of anti-government protests in Quito. The protests were over the removal by President Lenin Moreno’s administration of fuel subsidies on October 16, 2019 and other economic policies in a bid to obtain a loan from the International Monetary Fund (IMF).

References 

1979 births
Living people
Universidad San Francisco de Quito alumni
Women government ministers of Ecuador
Members of the National Congress (Ecuador)
Ecuadorian feminists
Female interior ministers
People from Quito
21st-century Ecuadorian women politicians
21st-century Ecuadorian politicians